Afrobeat is a Nigerian music genre that involves the combination of West African musical styles (such as traditional Yoruba music and highlife) and American funk, jazz, and soul influences, with a focus on chanted vocals, complex intersecting rhythms, and percussion. The style was pioneered in the 1960s by Nigerian multi-instrumentalist and bandleader Fela Kuti, who is responsible for popularizing the style both within and outside Nigeria.

Distinct from Afrobeat is Afrobeats – a sound originating in West Africa in the 21st century, one that takes in diverse influences and is an eclectic combination of genres such as hip hop, house, jùjú, ndombolo, R&B and soca. The two genres, though often conflated, are not the same.

History 
Afrobeat was developed in Nigeria in the late 1960s by Fela Kuti who, with drummer Tony Allen, experimented with different contemporary music of the time. Afrobeat was influenced by a variety of genres, such as highlife, fuji, and jùjú, as well as Yoruba vocal traditions, rhythm, and instruments. In the late 1950s, Kuti left Lagos to study abroad at the London School of Music where he was exposed to jazz. He returned to Lagos and played a highlife-jazz hybrid, albeit, without commercial success.

In 1969, Kuti and his band went on a trip to the U.S. and met Sandra Smith, a singer and former Black Panther. Sandra Smith (now known as Sandra Izsadore or Sandra Akanke Isidore) introduced Kuti to many writings of activists such as Martin Luther King Jr., Angela Davis, Jesse Jackson, and his biggest influence of all, Malcolm X.

As Kuti was interested in African-American politics, Smith would inform him of current events. In return, Kuti would fill her in on African culture. Since Kuti stayed at Smith's house and was spending so much time with her, he started to re-evaluate his music. That was when Kuti noticed that he was not playing African music. From that day forward, Kuti changed his sound and the message behind his music.

Upon arriving in Nigeria, Kuti also changed the name of his group to "Africa '70". The new sound hailed from a club that he established called the Afrika Shrine. The band maintained a five-year residency at the Afrika Shrine from 1970 to 1975 while Afrobeat thrived among Nigerian youth.

The name was partially borne out of an attempt to distinguish Fela Kuti's music from the soul music of American artists such as James Brown.

Prevalent in his and Lagbaja's music are native Nigerian harmonies and rhythms, taking different elements and combining, modernizing, and improvising upon them. Politics is essential to Afrobeat, since founder Kuti used social criticism to pave the way for social change. His message can be described as confrontational and controversial, which can be related to the political climate of most of the African countries in the 1970s, many of which were dealing with political injustice and military corruption while recovering from the transition from colonial governments to self-determination. As the genre spread throughout the African continent many bands took up the style. The recordings of these bands and their songs were rarely heard or exported outside the originating countries but many can now be found on compilation albums and CDs from specialist record shops.

Influence
Many jazz musicians have been attracted to Afrobeat. From Roy Ayers in the 1970s to Randy Weston in the 1990s, there have been collaborations that have resulted in albums such as Africa: Centre of the World by Roy Ayers, released on the Polydore label in 1981. In 1994, Branford Marsalis, the American jazz saxophonist, included samples of Fela's "Beasts of No Nation" on his Buckshot LeFonque album.

Afrobeat has also profoundly influenced important contemporary producers and musicians, such as Brian Eno and David Byrne, who credit Fela Kuti as an essential influence. Both worked on Talking Heads' highly acclaimed 1980 album Remain in Light, which brought polyrhythmic Afrobeat influences to Western music. The new generation of DJs and musicians of the 2000s who have fallen in love with both Kuti's material and other rare releases have made compilations and remixes of these recordings, thus re-introducing the genre to new generations of listeners and fans of afropop and groove.

In the late 1990s and early 2000s, a small Afrobeat scene began in Brooklyn, New York, with projects including Antibalas, The Daktaris and the Kokolo Afrobeat Orchestra. Since then, other artists like Zongo Junction have come onto the scene. Many others have cited Afrobeat as an influence like Daptone Records-adjacent groups The Budos Band and El Michels Affair. The horn section of Antibalas have been guest musicians on TV on the Radio's highly acclaimed 2008 album Dear Science, as well as on British band Foals' 2008 album Antidotes. Further examples are Val Veneto, Radio Bantu, Tam Tam Afrobeat, Combo Makabro, Marabunta Orquesta, Minga!, Antropofonica, Guanabana Afrobeat Orquesta, El Gran Capitan, Morbo y Mambo, Luka Afrobeat Orquesta or NikiLauda. Some Afrobeat influence can also be found in the music of Vampire Weekend and Paul Simon. In 2020, Antibalas was nominated for the Grammy Award for Best Global Music Album.

Namibian artist EES (Eric Sell) associates Afrobeat with reggae and kwaito.

In 2009, the music label Knitting Factory Records (KFR) produced the Broadway musical Fela! The story showcased Kuti's "courage and incredible musical mastery" along with the story of his life. The show had 11 Tony nominations, receiving three for Best Costumes, Best Sound and Best Choreography. Fela! was on Broadway for 15 months and was produced by notables such as Shawn "Jay-Z " Carter and Will and Jada Pinkett-Smith. Many celebrities were noted as attending the shows, including Denzel Washington, Madonna, Sting, Spike Lee (who saw it eight times), Kofi Annan, and Michelle Obama. Michelle Williams, former singer of girl group Destiny's Child, was cast as the role of Sandra Izsadore.

The "Festival de Afrobeat Independiente" (FAI) takes place regularly in Buenos Aires, where regional bands as well as well-known Afrobeat acts perform.

See also
 Afrobeats
 Afroswing
 Confusion (album)
 Latin music (genre)

References

Further reading
 Afrobeat (BBC archived page)
 Fela Kuti coined Afrobeat in Accra out of hate for James Brown – Prof John Collins

20th-century music genres
21st-century music genres
African popular music
Nigerian styles of music
Jazz genres
Yoruba music
Funk genres
Music of the African diaspora
Fela Kuti